Luxshare, officially Luxshare Precision Industry Co.,Ltd and also known as Luxshare-ICT. is a Chinese electronic components manufacturer.

History 
Wang Laichun is the company's chairwoman, and co-founder. Wang founded Luxshare after ten years at Foxconn. Her brother Wang Laishen is Luxshare's vice chairman and is also ex-Foxconn. Wang Laichun's leadership style is seen as similar to Foxconn's Terry Gou.

Luxshare was founded in 2004 in Dongguan, China. The company designs and manufacturers computer cables; it is also a key assembler of AirPods for Apple Inc. The company was listed publicly on the SME board of the Shenzhen Stock Exchange in 2010. 

In 2020, Luxshare became an iPhone assembler after acquiring two iPhone assembly plants from Wistron.

In 2022, Luxshare was accused by Taiwanese prosecutors of stealing trade secrets. They were alleged to have poached much of competitor Catcher Technology's China based research and development team, this combined with the theft of trade secrets from Catcher is alleged to have allowed Luxshare to rapidly  enter Apple's supply chain.

During the 2022 COVID-19 protests in China, Luxshare was reported by The Wall Street Journal to gain an additional foothold in Apple's supply chain following protests at a Foxconn factory in the Zhengzhou Airport Economy Zone.

See also  
 Pegatron

References

External links 

 

Electronics companies established in 2004
Chinese companies established in 2004
Electronics companies of China
Chinese brands